Thomas James Kenny (born July 13, 1962) is an American actor and comedian. He is known for voicing the titular character in SpongeBob SquarePants and associated media. Kenny has voiced many other characters, including Heffer Wolfe in Rocko's Modern Life, the Ice King in Adventure Time, the Narrator and Mayor in The Powerpuff Girls, Carl Chryniszzswics in Johnny Bravo, Dog in CatDog, Hank and Jeremy in Talking Tom and Friends, and Spyro from the Spyro video game series. His live-action work includes the comedy variety shows The Edge and Mr. Show. Kenny has won two Daytime Emmy Awards and two Annie Awards for his voice work as SpongeBob SquarePants and the Ice King. He often collaborates with his wife and fellow voice artist Jill Talley, who plays Karen on SpongeBob SquarePants.

Biography

Early life and stand-up comedy
Kenny was born and raised in Syracuse, New York, to Theresa Bridget (Donigan) and Paul Austin Kenny. As a young child, in the late 1960s and the 1970s, he loved drawing and collecting record albums. He met Bobcat Goldthwait in first grade and they became lifelong friends. In their mid-teens, they saw an ad for an open-mic night at Skaneateles that featured comedian Barry Crimmins with the moniker "Bear Cat". He and Goldthwait went to the event, and performed under the monikers Tomcat and Bobcat, respectively, as a tribute to Crimmins, after which Goldthwait used Bobcat as his stage name. Describing Kenny's stand-up routines, Goldthwait said, "Tom would get up there and talk about his therapist and he didn't even have a therapist, he just loved Woody Allen."

Kenny went to Bishop Grimes Junior/Senior High School, a Catholic high school. After college, he performed stand-up comedy around the country for about eight years before he moved on to other venues.

Television and film career

Kenny has acted in many films and TV shows, debuting in How I Got into College (1989) and later appeared in films such as Shakes the Clown (1991) and Comic Book: The Movie (2004). On television, he would host the "Music News" segments of Friday Night Videos in the early 1990s. He appeared in sketch comedy shows The Edge which aired on Fox from 1992 to 1993, and Mr. Show which aired on HBO from 1995 to 1998, both roles in the show were as a regular cast member. He appears in the live-action segments of SpongeBob SquarePants as Patchy the Pirate, appeared on R. L. Stine's The Haunting Hour: The Series on the season four episode, "Uncle Howee" as Uncle Howee, a high-energy kids' show host with strange powers.

Voice acting

Kenny said that he voices "a lot of sweet yellow characters for some reason." He described SpongeBob's voice as in between that of a child and an adult, stating "Think a Stan Laurel, Jerry Lewis kind of child-man. Kind of like a Munchkin but not quite, kind of like a kid, but not in a Charlie Brown child's voice on the TV shows."

Joe Murray auditioned Kenny for voice acting roles for Rocko's Modern Life in a casting call in Los Angeles, California. On one occasion, the producers required Kenny to fill the role of Charlie Adler, who was absent. He voices Cupid for the Nickelodeon show The Fairly OddParents.

Joe Murray chose Kenny for several roles on another of his projects, Camp Lazlo as Scoutmaster Lumpus and Slinkman, because Murray, after seeing Kenny's previous work for Rocko's Modern Life, felt that Kenny "adds writing to his roles" and "brings so much".

He voiced Dog in CatDog, as well as the voice of Cliff. He voices many characters in The Powerpuff Girls, including the Mayor, the Narrator, Mitch Mitchelson, Snake and Little Arturo from the Gangreen Gang, Rainbow the Clown, etc. He voiced Eduardo and various other characters in Foster's Home For Imaginary Friends, Dr. Two-Brains in the PBS Kids show, WordGirl, and the villains Knightbrace, the Common Cold and Mr. Wink in Codename Kids Next Door.

Kenny is the Penguin in the 2004 TV series The Batman.

He voiced the character Squanchy on Rick and Morty.

He plays a number of roles in the Transformers Animated TV show. A few of the characters he voices in this series are Starscream and his clones, Isaac Sumdac and Waspinator. Kenny also voiced several characters on the animated show Xiaolin Showdown, as well as the Autobots Skids and Wheelie in the live-action Transformers film series. On Dilbert, Kenny voiced Ratbert, Asok, Dilbert's shower, and some minor characters. He played Mr. Hal Gibson in the animated kids show Super Robot Monkey Team Hyper Force GO!.

In 2009, Kenny became a regular cast voice in the Fox comedy series Sit Down, Shut Up. He voices Muhammad Sabeeh "Happy" Fa-ach Nuabar, the secretive custodian who is plotting a terrorist attack, as well as Happy's interpreter. The series premiered on April 19, 2009. Kenan Thompson, Kristin Chenoweth, Jason Bateman, Nick Kroll, Cheri Oteri, Henry Winkler, Will Arnett, and Will Forte are the other main cast members.

He plays the Ice King and Magic Man on Adventure Time. In 2011, Kenny took over the role of Rabbit from Ken Sansom in Winnie the Pooh. From 2012 to 2014, Kenny voiced Woody Johnson on Comedy Central's Brickleberry. He voiced various characters in the Cartoon Network programme Mixels, Sumo in the Cartoon Network programme Clarence, Daddo in Henry Hugglemonster, Dr. Otto Octavius on The Ultimate Spider-Man, and Leo Callisto in Miles from Tomorrowland.

He has also provided voices in television advertisements for Best Buy (as an elf for a Christmas spot), Experian (as a talking modem alongside DC Douglas), and Talking Hank in the YouTube web series Talking Tom and Friends.

In video games, Kenny is best known as the voice of Spyro the Dragon, having replaced previous voice actor Carlos Alazraqui. He first voiced Spyro in Spyro 2: Ripto's Rage!, and continued to voice the character up until Spyro: A Hero's Tail, where he was replaced by Jess Harnell. He also voiced another character in the series, Sgt. James Byrd, in Spyro: Year of the Dragon. He reprised both roles in Spyro Reignited Trilogy, a collection of modern remakes of the original Spyro trilogy.

Kenny was a guest star on HarmonQuest as both himself and his "in-game character" Legnahcra the maître d' of Virtuous Harmony.

He also voiced Fethry Duck in the 2017 version of DuckTales. In 2022, he voiced Benito Mussolini and other characters in Guillermo del Toro's Pinocchio.

SpongeBob SquarePants

While working on the animated series Rocko's Modern Life, Kenny met marine biologist and animator Stephen Hillenburg. After the cancellation of Rocko's Modern Life in 1996, Hillenburg began developing his own concept for an ocean-themed series, building off of his background in marine science. Hillenburg said that he wanted to base the show on his favorite animal, the sea sponge, "because it's a funny animal, a strange one." To voice this character, Hillenburg approached Kenny in 1997.

The series, titled SpongeBob SquarePants, premiered on Nickelodeon on May 1, 1999. It soon became a commercial success. Kenny plays various other characters on the show, including the live-action character Patchy the Pirate and the voices of Gary the Snail, the French Narrator (a parody of Jacques Cousteau), and SpongeBob's father (Harold SquarePants). In 2010, Kenny received the Annie Award for "Voice Acting in a Television Production" for his role as SpongeBob in SpongeBob's Truth or Square (season 6, episode 23–24). He also voiced SpongeBob in the sequel film released on February 6, 2015. In 2018 and 2020, he received the Daytime Emmy Award for Outstanding Performer in an Animated Program.

Personal life
Kenny first met his wife Jill Talley in 1992 while working on The Edge. The two have collaborated on many productions together, including SpongeBob SquarePants (in which Talley voices Karen Plankton). They also both appeared in the music video for "Tonight, Tonight" by The Smashing Pumpkins. They have two children, Mack (born 1998) and Nora (born 2003). The Kennys live in Studio City, California.

Awards and nominations

References

External links

 
 
 Interview with Tom Kenny on Fresh Air
 

1962 births
Living people
American male comedians
American male film actors
American sketch comedians
American stand-up comedians
American male television actors
American male video game actors
American male voice actors
20th-century American male actors
21st-century American male actors
Annie Award winners
Daytime Emmy Award winners
Male actors from Syracuse, New York
Comedians from New York (state)
20th-century American comedians
21st-century American comedians
SpongeBob SquarePants
Cartoon Network people